Giatec Scientific Inc. is a Canadian-based company with headquarters located in Ottawa, Ontario. It is a developer and manufacturer of nondestructive testing quality control and condition assessment devices for the construction industry.

History 
Giatec Scientific Inc. was co-founded by Pouria Ghods of Carleton University and Aali R. Alizadeh of the University of Ottawa in September 2010. The pair began working with advisers at Invest Ottawa, who arranged sources, funding and ideas to bring Giatec's products to the market.

The company's first product was a sensor to detect corrosion speed in the rebar/steel inside concrete. Unlike other non-destructive testing methods available at the time, Giatec used mobile-based applications software and smart technology to collect and analyze data.

In 2012, Giatec became independent of Invest Ottawa. That year, after the collapse of the Algo Centre Mall in Elliot Lake in 2012, Giatec's equipment was used in the forensic structural examination that was initiated as part of the public inquiry.

Giatec has developed a variety of testing devices and sensors for measurement of concrete permeability, electrical resistivity measurement of concrete, half-cell corrosion, corrosion rate, concrete temperature, and concrete maturity. In 2014, Giatec won the Rio Info 2013 Innovation Award, and in 2014, the company was included in the Ottawa Business Journal's annual list of "Startups to Watch". Giatec is also the recipient of Ottawa's Top 10 Fastest Growing Companies, and Canada's Top 500 Fastest Growing Companies in 2018.

Giatec also began to develop Internet of Things (IoT) applications for the construction industry through wireless concrete temperature and maturity sensors. In March 2015, the company released a new electrical resistivity monitoring device that sends data directly to a smartphone through a downloadable application. In October 2016, Giatec released Smart Concrete, a new IoT-based solution for ready-mix concrete producers. Giatec later changed the name of their product due to opposition from Kryton International Inc., which holds trademark registrations for "Smart Concrete".

Giatec was awarded a $2.4M grant by the SDTC to commercialize a new clean-tech solution to optimize the amount of cement used by readymix concrete producers. On Nov. 19th, Paul Loucks (Ottawa tech veteran and former CEO of Halogen Software) joined Giatec as the new CEO of the company.

After 11 years of organic growth, Giatec raised single-digit million Euro funding from HeidelbergCement in May 2022 to develop and commercialize new software and sensor solutions for concrete monitoring and AI-based concrete mixture optimization.

Products
The Giatec product range of nondestructive testing devices can be divided into three areas: laboratory devices, which include products that can be used to measure the permeability of concrete specimens; hand-held portable field inspection devices that can be used to conduct in-situ condition assessment of concrete structures such as bridges; and embedded wireless sensors for real-time monitoring of concrete properties such as temperature, humidity, maturity, and strength.

These devices collect several types of data:
 Corrosion Mapping: XCell and iCOR together collect data about corrosion in rebar/steel in the concrete structure, and then transmit the data using and Android-based smartphone or tablet application to a remote location for analysis. iCOR's CEPRA technology (Connectionless Electrical Pulse Response Analysis) was recognized by National Association of Corrosion Engineers (NACE) Corrosion Innovation Awards in 2019. 
 Chloride Permeability: the Perma2 device carries out the Rapid chloride permeability (RCP) test, passing an electrical charge through concrete to determine its ability to resist chloride ion penetration.
 Electrical Resistivity: Giatec manufactures three testing devices which measure electrical resistivity for quality control, crack detection, and the setting time of fresh concrete. One of these is the Smartbox, a compact wireless sensor that sends data to a handheld Android Smartphone/tablet. The other two are laboratory test devices for concrete electrical resistance measurement, RCON and Surf.
 Concrete Maturity: Giatec has several wireless sensors, including SmartRock and BlueRock, for monitoring concrete properties such as temperature, maturity, strength, and humidity. These are mobile-based sensors that are embedded in concrete during construction. The SmartRock maturity sensor was awarded the Experts' Choice as the Most Innovative Product (MIP) by Concrete Construction at the World of Concrete in 2019.

References

External links 
 

Concrete
Nondestructive testing
Sensors
Internet of things
2010 establishments in Canada